Clifton Bridge may refer to:

Clifton Bridge (Nottingham), United Kingdom
Clifton Bridge (York), United Kingdom
Clifton Suspension Bridge, Bristol, United Kingdom
Clifton Bridge railway station, a former railway station built to serve the bridge